Colletta di Castelbianco is an ancient village in the Maritime Alps and near the Italian Riviera in the province of Savona in Liguria, Italy.

The village is entirely built of stone and was probably established as a defense against the Saracens in the 13th century.

Abandoned in the 1950s, Colletta has been the subject of a restoration project started in the 1990s operating on two levels. On one level, has been made a general restoration of the ancient settlement, respecting the original materials and building techniques (the restoration plan was developed by architect Giancarlo De Carlo); on another level, the village has been provided with a sophisticated technological infrastructure (the telematization project was conceived by Valerio Saggini and planned by Valerio Saggini and Stefania Belloni) which has enabled new inhabitants to benefit from the widest possible range of telecommunications resources. In this way, they are able to enjoy the peace and isolation offered by the village while staying in touch with the work environment and, more generally, with the information resources available all over the world. Thus it is possible for  remote workers to live or spend  in Colletta.

In 2005, the village had its first olive harvest in 30 years and is now producing small quantities of high-grade olive oil from the local taggiasca olives.

Gallery

References

External links
http://www.colletta.it
"Colletta di Castelbianco" Project: Rediscovering Sense of Place in the Era of the Global Village, by Valerio Saggini.
Zurück in die Zukunft. Die Zeit, 1999.08.26.
Back to the Future. Baglioni, 1998.12.01.
Vivere l'età della sostenibilità: l'approccio ecologico all'abitare tra domotica e tecnologie appropriate. by Mauro Bertagnin and Clelia Mungiguerra. "The Living Building in Europe Toward the Third Millennium", International Symposium Proceedings, Naples, October 10–11, 1997, Clean Edizioni, Napoli, 1997

Italian Riviera